The second season of Golpe de Sorte (Lucky Break) began airing on SIC on 1 July 2019 and ended on 9 September 2019. The season two of the series stars Maria João Abreu, Dânia Neto, Jorge Corrula and Diana Chaves.

Plot 
Crime in Alvorinha! On the floor of the wide, one body. People around. We realize it's our Euromillionaire. Panic! The Garcia are in shock, crying for help ... until Carlos (Pedro Laginha) and Alice (Diana Chaves) arrive, who introduces himself to Teresa (Oceana Basílio) husband for the first time. They both try to save Céu's (Maria João Abreu) life from heaven. Will they be able to avoid tragedy?

Tragic, little Beatriz (Matilde Serrão) life. Frightened, she is in the Nobrega's house to ask Teresa to protect her from her parents. Priest Aníbal (Diogo Amaral), Teresa and Claudio (Duarte Gomes) try to solve the drama of the girl, calling Dalia (Andreia Dinis) and Serafim (Frederico Barata) but the conversation does not go well. The suspicious behavior of Bia's parents suggests a dark past...

With the guilts of the past, Jessica (Carolina Carvalho) is desolate after seeing the marriage broken. The father José Luis (José Raposo) tries to comfort her but it is Preciosa (Manuela Maria), the grandmother of the bride, who ends up having the right words. Nothing like a person full of shadows to understand each other's sins. Especially if it's a Toledo...

The Garcia saw an ambulance take Céu to the Hospital. Meanwhile, the police arrive and start questioning those present. The first is Ricardo (António Camelier), who tries to warn them about the villains Sílvia (Dânia Neto) and Caio (Jorge Corrula) but, without proof, ends up pointing the focus of guilt to himself. Realizing that they have nothing against her, Sílvia, who still has no passport, finally insinuates to the police that the abduction of Telma (Isabela Valadeiro) was orchestrated by... Ricardo. In this ping pong game, who can win?

Who does not want to lose the track to Tino (João Paulo Rodrigues) is José Luís who goes to the arrumos room to confront the lover of the daughter but finds an empty room. Tino, humbled by the situation, had fled far, eventually finding and being comforted by... Branca (Sara Norte). What can come out of the relationship of these two?

After a long time in the expectation, the Garcia know by Bruno (Ângelo Rodrigues) that the euromillionaire is stabilized thanks to the intervention of the new doctor, Alice Barreto. Heaven finally goes to the palace but... can not speak. Did our protagonist remain forever silent?

In the last plane, we see a hand with Sílvia's passport. Who could be maneuvering in silence?

Cast

Main Cast

Recurrent Cast

Guest Star Cast

Episodes

References 

Portuguese television series
Sociedade Independente de Comunicação original programming